Mexico–Nicaragua relations are the diplomatic relations between Mexico and Nicaragua. Both nations are members of the Association of Caribbean States, Community of Latin American and Caribbean States, Organization of American States, Organization of Ibero-American States and the United Nations.

History 
Mexico and Nicaragua are two Latin American nations that share a common history in the fact that both nations were colonized by the Spanish empire. In 1821, Mexico gained independence from Spain and Nicaragua became a part of the First Mexican Empire. In 1823, the empire dissolved and Nicaragua, along with Guatemala, El Salvador, Honduras and Costa Rica joined the United Provinces of Central America. In 1838, the union dissolved and Nicaragua became an independent nation. One year later, in 1839, Mexico and Nicaragua established diplomatic relations.

In 1937, the first of the Somoza presidents of Nicaragua took power. In the 1960s, the Nicaraguan Revolution began by a rebel group called the Sandinista National Liberation Front. During that time period Mexico, although initially a supporter of the Somoza's, soon changed position and offered support to the Sandinistas. In May 1979, Mexico broke diplomatic relations with Nicaragua over repeated human rights abuses carried out by the government of Anastasio Somoza Debayle. In July 1979, Anastasio Somoza Debayle was removed from power and Mexico re-established diplomatic relations with Nicaragua. In 1990, Mexico, along with the government of Colombia, Panama and Venezuela created the Contadora Group to try and mediate in the Central American crises that was gripping the region at the time. The Nicaraguan revolution came to an end after the election of President Violeta Chamorro in 1990.

Since the end of the revolution, Mexico and Nicaragua have worked together in numerous projects such as in disaster relief, migration and development. In 2001, both nations agreed to implement the Mesoamerica Project (also known as the Plan Puebla-Panama). In December 2012, Nicaraguan President Daniel Ortega attended the inauguration of Mexican President Enrique Peña Nieto.

High-level visits

Presidential visits from Nicaragua to Mexico

 President Daniel Ortega (1985, 1988, 2007, 2010, 2012)
 President Violeta Chamorro (1990, 1991, 1993)
 President Arnoldo Alemán (1997, 2000)
 President Enrique Bolaños (March & June 2002)

Presidential visits from Mexico to Nicaragua

 President Gustavo Díaz Ordaz (1966)
 President Carlos Salinas de Gortari (1993)
 President Ernesto Zedillo (1997)
 President Vicente Fox (2004)
 President Felipe Calderón (2007, 2009)

Bilateral agreements
Both nations have signed several bilateral agreements such as an Agreement on the Exchange of Diplomatic Communications (1919); Agreement of Governmental Cooperation (1983); Agreement of Touristic Cooperation (1990); Agreement of Cooperation to Combat Drug Trafficking and Drug Dependency (1992); Extradition Treaty (1993); Agreement of Technical and Scientific Cooperation (1995); Treaty of Cooperation on Mutual Legal Assistance in Criminal Matters (1997); Treaty on the Execution of Criminal Judgments (2000) and an Agreement on Educational and Cultural Cooperation (2000).

Transportation
There are direct flights between Mexico and Managua with Aeroméxico Connect.

Trade relations 
In 1997, Mexico and Nicaragua signed a free trade agreement. Since its establishment (and with the implementation of a New Mexico-Central America free trade agreement in 2013), trade between the two nations has grown substantially. In 2018, two-way trade between both nations amounted to US$1 billion. Mexico is Nicaragua's third biggest foreign direct investor in the country with investments reaching up to US$183 million. Mexico's main exports to Nicaragua include: electronic appliances, copper wire, medicines and vehicles while Nicaragua's main exports to Mexico include: vehicle parts, peanuts, vegetable oil, sugar and textiles. Several Mexican multinational companies operate in Nicaragua, such as: América Móvil, Cemex, Grupo Bimbo and Grupo Lala (among others).

Resident diplomatic missions 
 Mexico has an embassy in Managua.
 Nicaragua has an embassy in Mexico City and a consulate in Tapachula.

See also 
 Nicaraguan diaspora

References 
 Mexican Ministry of Foreign Affairs on bilateral relations between Mexico and Nicaragua (in Spanish)

 
Nicaragua
Bilateral relations of Nicaragua